The 1948 Toronto Argonauts finished in third place in the Interprovincial Rugby Football Union with a 5–6–1 record and failed to make the playoffs. American halfback Ken Whitlock played four games to become the Argonauts first black player.

Regular season

Standings

Schedule

References

Toronto Argonauts seasons
1948 Canadian football season by team